The United States Women's Curling Championship is the annual women's national curling championship for the United States. It is run by the United States Curling Association (USCA) and typically held in conjunction with the Men's Curling Championship. The champions are eligible to represent the United States at the World Women's Curling Championships if they also rank in the top 75 teams over the last two seasons in the World Curling Tour Order of Merit or have earned 40 points in the Order of Merit year-to-date rankings.

History
The 2021 Championship was originally planned to be held February 6–13 at the ImOn Ice Arena in Cedar Rapids, Iowa, and it would have been the first time the Women's National Championship was held in Iowa. But in August, 2020 the arena was damaged during a severe derecho storm. The ongoing COVID-19 pandemic caused delays in repairing the arena and in November, 2020 the USCA announced that an alternative host site would be found. Only a month later, the USCA announced another change to the 2021 Championship when they declared that all remaining 2020–21 events would be either cancelled or postponed until late spring 2021. This postponement delayed the Women's National Championship until after the 2021 World Women's Championship and so the 2020 champions, Tabitha Peterson's team, were selected to represent the United States. This gave the team the opportunity to compete at Worlds which they missed the previous year when the 2020 World Women's Championship was cancelled due to the COVID-19 pandemic. On March 29, 2021 it was announced that the 2021 Women's Championship will be held in conjunction with the Men's Nationals and Mixed Doubles Nationals in a bio-secure bubble at Wausau Curling Club in Wausau, Wisconsin in May, 2021.

Qualification
The qualification methods and format of the championship has changed over time, but currently eight teams play in each championship.  Four spots are awarded to the top American teams in the World Curling Federation (WCF) World Team Ranking System at a particular date roughly two months out from the championship. Three spots are awarded to the top teams from a Challenge Round, open to all United States curlers. The final spot is awarded to a team from that year's Junior Championships, selected by the USCA.

For the 2021 Championship the qualification methods were modified slightly due to impacts of the COVID-19 pandemic. The field of eight teams included the 2020 champion and runner-up, the top three teams in the WCF World Team Ranking System on September 1, 2020, and the top three teams from the Challenge Round.

Format
The current format begins with a complete round robin where each team plays every other team. The playoff format depends on the rankings at the end of the round robin. If one team finishes the round robin at least one win ahead of the other teams then that team advances directly to the final and faces the winner of a game between the 2nd and 3rd ranked teams. If two or three teams are tied for first place after the round robin then the top three teams play a version of a page playoff. The 1st and 2nd ranked teams play each other with the winner advancing to the championship game. The loser of the 1st vs 2nd game plays the 3rd place team with the winner of this game advancing to the championship game. If four teams are tied for first place after the round robin then all four advance to a single elimination style playoff. The 1st ranked team plays the 4th while the 2nd ranked team plays the 3rd. The winners of these two games play in the championship.

Past champions
The site and winner of every women's national championship since it began in 1977:

Notes
  This column shows the results of the team representing the United States at the World Curling Championships. Based on the rules implemented by the United States Curling Association for the 2013–14 season, the United States team at the World Curling Championships is not necessarily the team that won the national championship. Beginning in 2018, the winner will once again represent the US at the World Championships, provided they have a high enough ranking on the World Curling Tour. 
  2020 World Women's Curling Championship was cancelled due to the COVID-19 pandemic The 2020 Champions represented the US at the 2021 World Women's Curling Championship.
  The 2022 US Championship was cancelled due to the COVID-19 pandemic. The 2021 Champions represented the US at the 2022 World Women's Curling Championship.

Champions by state
(As of 2023)

Sportsmanship award
The Ann Brown Sportsmanship Award has been presented annually since 2007 to one male and one female athlete at the National Championships who are judged to best embody the USCA Spirit of Curling as voted on by their peers. The award is given in memory of Ann Brown, who was the first female president of the United States Curling Association and was the second female inductee into the USCA Hall of Fame.

See also
Scottish Women's Curling Championship
Scotties Tournament of Hearts (Canada) 
United States Men's Curling Championship

References

External links
United States Curling Association

Curling
Curling
Recurring sporting events established in 1977